The Spell is a 1997 solo album by singer and songwriter Ivan Doroschuk, the leader of Men Without Hats, recording as "Ivan."

Production 
The release and songwriting credits for The Spell used only Doroschuk's first name.

The Spell was the only solo album that Doroschuk released. He recorded demos for an intended solo follow-up, Mote in God's Eye, some of which were worked into the 2003 album No Hats Beyond This Point and released under the name of Men Without Hats.

Two singles from the album, "Open Your Eyes" and "Superbadgirls", were released with music videos.

Critical reception 
Writing for AllMusic, Aaron Badgley wrote that the album was a "disappointing affair", referring to "Superbadgirls" as "embarrassing." He nevertheless described the title track and "Open Your Eyes" as "highlights."

Track listing 
All songs written by Ivan Doroschuk, except as noted.
 "The Spell"
 "Superbadgirls"
 "Chain Reaction"
 "Open Your Eyes"
 "1972 (Slippin' Away)"
 "You" – (Colin Doroschuk)
 "Forever"
 "WWW"
 "Somethin'"
 "Fly"
 "Outro"

References

External links 
 The Spell at Discogs

1997 albums
Men Without Hats albums
Albums produced by John Punter